The Green-Richman Arcade (also known as the Parsley and Stone Arcade) is a historic site in St. Petersburg, Florida. It is located at 689 Central Avenue. On January 30, 1998, it was added to the U.S. National Register of Historic Places.

References

External links

 Pinellas County listings at National Register of Historic Places
 Green-Richman Arcade at Florida's Office of Cultural and Historical Programs

National Register of Historic Places in Pinellas County, Florida
Buildings and structures in St. Petersburg, Florida